Neuenhagen is a railway station located in Neuenhagen bei Berlin, in the Märkisch-Oderland district of Brandenburg. It is served by the S-Bahn line .

References

Berlin S-Bahn stations
Railway stations in Brandenburg
Buildings and structures in Märkisch-Oderland
Railway stations in Germany opened in 1867